The 1986 Brazilian Grand Prix was a Formula One motor race held at Jacarepaguá in Rio de Janeiro on 23 March 1986. It was the opening race of the 1986 Formula One World Championship. It was the 15th Brazilian Grand Prix and the seventh to be held at Jacarepaguá.

The race was won by local driver Nelson Piquet, driving a Williams-Honda, after he started from second position. Compatriot Ayrton Senna took pole position in his Lotus-Renault, but Piquet overtook him on lap 3 and went on to win from him by 34 seconds. Frenchman Jacques Laffite finished third in a Ligier-Renault.

Summary
The new season had seen many driver changes, the most significant was Piquet's arrival at Williams after seven years at Brabham, while Keke Rosberg joined McLaren and Elio de Angelis joined Brabham in the other major moves. Senna used his influence at Lotus to ensure they hired a driver that would not interfere with his campaign which left Derek Warwick out of a seat, although that would prove to be temporary. Williams was missing their team principal, Frank Williams who had had a car accident in pre-season testing that left him a quadriplegic.

Senna led from pole position but was soon under threat from the Williams pair. Nigel Mansell spun off the track on the opening lap after contact with Senna, but Piquet was in the lead by lap three. As pitstops began it started to look as though Alain Prost (McLaren MP4/2C) might pull a surprise by only pitting once and snatching the win away from the Brazilians but that came to an end along with Prost's TAG-Porsche engine just past half-distance.

There was no threat to the Brazilian pair after that with Piquet retaking the lead from Senna after the latter's final tyre stop. Behind Laffite was his Ligier teammate René Arnoux. Fifth place was taken by the Tyrrell 014 of Martin Brundle, his first points finish since his debut season two years previously. Gerhard Berger finished sixth in his Benetton B186 on the debut for the new team which had taken over the Toleman team during the off-season. Philippe Streiff in the second Tyrrell, Elio de Angelis (Brabham BT55), Johnny Dumfries (Lotus 98T) and Teo Fabi (Benetton B186) were the only other finishers in a day of high attrition where Mansell had been the only non-mechanical retirement.

Classification

Qualifying

Race

Championship standings after the race

Drivers' Championship standings

Constructors' Championship standings

References

Brazilian Grand Prix
Brazilian Grand Prix
Grand Prix
Brazilian Grand Prix